Raheb Rural District is a rural district (dehestan) in the Central District of Kabudarahang County, Hamadan Province, Iran. At the 2006 census, its population was 22,626, in 5,780 families. The rural district has 7 villages.

References 

Rural Districts of Hamadan Province
Kabudarahang County